On December 11, 1941, Italy declared war on the United States in response to the latter's declaration of war upon the Empire of Japan following the attack on Pearl Harbor four days earlier. Germany also declared war on the U.S. the same day. The US immediately responded by declaring war on Germany and Italy, thus thrusting the United States in fighting two major fronts across the Pacific and Atlantic Oceans in World War II.

Background  
On December 7, 1941, 353 aircraft of the Empire of Japan attacked the U.S. naval base at Pearl Harbor and inflicted mass destruction to American life and property, beginning a war between Japan and the United States. On December 8, 1941, the U.S. declared war upon Japan in response to the Japanese attack on Pearl Harbor. Three days later, Italian dictator, Benito Mussolini, made his declaration first - from the balcony over the Piazza Venezia in Rome - pledging the "powers of the pact of steel" were determined to win. Then Adolf Hitler made his announcement at the Reichstag in Berlin saying he had tried to avoid direct conflict with the U.S. but, under the Tripartite Pact signed on 27 September 1940, Germany was obliged to join with Italy to defend its ally Japan. Hitler stated that, "After victory has been achieved, Germany, Italy and Japan will continue in closest co-operation with a view to establishing a new and just order."

Text of the declaration 
This is another day of solemn decision in Italy’s history and of memorable events destined to give a new course to the history of continents.

The powers of the steel pact, Fascist Italy and Nationalist Socialist Germany, ever closely linked, participate from today on the side of heroic Japan against the United States of America.

The Tripartite Pact becomes a military alliance which draws around its colors 250,000,000 men determined to do all in order to win.

Neither the Axis nor Japan wanted an extension of the conflict.

One man, one man only, a real tyrannical democrat, through a series of infinite provocations, betraying with a supreme fraud the population of his country, wanted the war and had prepared for it day by day with diabolical obstinacy.

The formidable blows that on the immense Pacific expanse have been already inflicted on American forces show how prepared are the soldiers of the Empire of the Rising Sun.

I say to you, and you will understand, that it is a privilege to fight with them.

Today, the Tripartite Pact, with the plenitude of its forces and its moral and material resources, is a formidable instrument for the war and a certainty for victory.

Tomorrow, the Tripartite Pact will become an instrument of just peace between the peoples.

Italians! Once more arise and be worthy of this historical hour!

We shall win.

See also
 Declarations of war during World War II
 Diplomatic history of World War II
 Kellogg–Briand Pact

References 

Declarations of war during World War II
1941 in the United States
1941 in Italy
December 1941 events
Italy–United States military relations
1941 documents
Axis powers